The 2016 Orange Bowl was a college football bowl game played on December 30, 2016 at Hard Rock Stadium in Miami Gardens, Florida, played between the Michigan Wolverines of the Big Ten Conference against the Florida State Seminoles of the Atlantic Coast Conference (ACC). It was one of the 2016–17 bowl games that concluded the 2016 NCAA Division I FBS football season.  Florida State won the game by a score of 33–32.  Dalvin Cook, running back for the Seminoles, was named the game's MVP.

The game was played on the 30th instead of on December 31 or January 1, as the following day's College Football Playoff semi-final bowls were played with earlier kick-off times that intruded into the New Year's Six early-afternoon scheduling window.

Teams
This Orange Bowl game featured the Michigan Wolverines and the Florida State Seminoles.

This was the third meeting between the two schools, with the all time series tied at 1–1; the most recent previous meeting was in 1991, when the Seminoles defeated the Wolverines by a score of 51–31 in Ann Arbor, Michigan.  The other meeting occurred in 1986 when the Wolverines defeated the Seminoles by a score of 20–18, a game also played in Ann Arbor.

Michigan Wolverines

After finishing their regular season with a 10–2 record, the Wolverines were selected to their third Orange Bowl appearance. This was their 45th bowl game appearance, the 11th-highest total all-time among FBS schools.

Florida State Seminoles

After finishing their regular season with a 9–3 record, the Seminoles were selected to their 10th Orange Bowl appearance, the third most Orange Bowl appearances by any team. This will be their 46th bowl game appearance.

Game summary

Scoring summary

Statistics

References

2016–17 NCAA football bowl games
2016
2016 Orange Bowl
2016 Orange Bowl
2016 in sports in Florida
December 2016 sports events in the United States